Crossbow Technology, Inc. (also referred to as XBOW) was a California-based company with two main products. One was based on sensors and fibre optic gyroscope inertial sensor systems. This included inertial measurement units, attitude and heading reference systems, digital inclinometers and guidance, navigation and control units. And the other was based on GPS and radios using cellular phone technology with multiple environmental sensors that included asset tracking products.

Company
Crossbow was founded by Mike A. Horton in 1995 to exploit microelectromechanical systems (MEMS) inertial sensors.  It was initially based on technology developed at the University of California, Berkeley supported by A. Richard Newton. Crossbow Technology had investment from Cisco, Intel and the Paladin Capital Group in 2005.

Past products included the AHRS500GA, used in the Capstone Program of the US Federal Aviation Administration. When introduced in 2003 it was the first stand-alone, completely solid-state FAA certified attitude and heading reference system (AHRS).  A follow-on product, the AHRS510GA was designed into the Eclipse Aviation mode 500 very light jet.

Crossbow products included the CTXD02 digital inclinometer, VG700 vertical gyroscope and GNAV540 INS/GPS guidance, navigation and control unit. These products were used on airborne, marine and ground platforms such as the Hunter RQ-5A Unmanned Aerial Vehicle, ITAS and LRAS targeting systems.

Crossbow supplied products for shipment visibility and asset tracking. The company provided integrated peel and stick devices, featuring GSM/GPRS radios, GPS and sensors. These environmental sensors provided shippers with asset tracking and  shipment environment exposure history and tracking capabilities.

Crossbow was one of the first suppliers of the Berkeley-style MICA sensor nodes that it called "motes".  These run the TinyOS operating system.  Follow-on products included the MICA2 (868/916 MHz) and MICAz (2.4 GHz) motes, and the Intel-designed IMOTE2.  Crossbow also made a software design platform for its hardware called MoteWorks.

Crossbow received awards for these products, including a "Best of Sensors Expo Gold 2006" and the BP Helios Award.

In 2008, Crossbow released eKo Pro Series System, a wireless sensor system that monitors crops, vineyards, agriculture, and the environment. It's sensors can monitor soil moisture, ambient temperature, leaf wetness of a crop. In the same year, Crossbow Japan released the NeoMote to monitor energy usage in a building and provide a visual display for energy saving.
Formerly a joint venture, Crossbow Japan became the Sensor Networks and Systems department of Sumitomo Precision Products.

On June 5, 2011, Crossbow was acquired by Moog Inc. for about $32 million.

References

External links

Electronics companies of the United States
Companies based in San Jose, California